KZGM is a non-commercial educational FM broadcast station on 88.1 MHz at Cabool, Missouri. The station produces over 50% of its programming locally featuring local and independent artists as well as coverage of area events and issues. The station is listener supported. It is locally owned an operated.  It is owned by Real Community Radio Network at the same location as the studio.  It runs a community radio format and describes itself as providing the first public radio service to over 25,000 people.

As of the end of July 2010, KZGM is being fed to 90.7 WAZU Peoria, Illinois as well, while WAZU establishes its permanent operations.

See also
List of community radio stations in the United States

References

External links
 

Radio stations established in 2009
Community radio stations in the United States
Texas County, Missouri
ZGM